The 1937 Arkansas Razorbacks football team represented the University of Arkansas in the Southwest Conference (SWC) during the 1937 college football season. In their ninth year under head coach Fred Thomsen, the Razorbacks compiled a 6–2–2 record (3–2–1 against SWC opponents), finished in third place in the SWC, and outscored their opponents by a combined total of 186 to 89.

Schedule

References

Arkansas
Arkansas Razorbacks football seasons
Arkansas Razorbacks football